The 2018 Amata Friendship Cup was the first edition of the Amata Friendship Cup matches, held 21–23 December at the Amata Spring Country Club in Chonburi, Thailand. The Amata Friendship Cup is a team competition between the top mixed-gender professional and amateur golfers from Thailand and Japan. It is a three-day match play event between teams of twelve players with a similar format to the Ryder Cup and Solheim Cup. Boonchu Ruangkit and Virada Nirapathpongporn captained the Thai team and Naomichi Ozaki and Miho Koga captained the Japanese team.

Team Thailand won by a score of 15–13.

Format
The Amata Friendship Cup is a match play event, with each match worth one point. The format is as follows:
Day 1 (Friday): Four foursome (alternate shot) matches in a morning session and four fourball (better ball) matches in an afternoon session. 
Day 2 (Saturday): Four foursome (alternate shot) matches in a morning session and four fourball (better ball) matches in an afternoon session.
Day 3 (Sunday): 12 singles matches. All 12 players from each team participate.

Teams
Each team consisted of five male professionals, five female professionals, one male and one female amateur.

Team Thailand

Team Japan

Day one
Friday, 21 December 2018

Morning foursomes
The opening round of four fourball matches started at 7:15 am local time. The first point of the 2018 Amata Friendship Cup was won by Team Japan, with Ryuko Tokimatsu and Erika Hara winning 6 & 5 against Prayad Marksaeng and Moriya Jutanugarn. Prom Meesawat and Pannarat Thanapolboonyaras came from two down after the fourth and fifth hole to beat Masahiro Kawamura and Mami Fukuda two up. Jaidee and Thidapa Suwannapura also won by one against Kodai Ichihara and Sakura Koiwai one up. In the last match, Aphibarnrat and Thitikul won the seventeenth hole to halve Satoshi Kodaira and Yuri Yoshida, and to end the first morning 2–1 in favour of Team Thailand.

Afternoon four-ball
The afternoon session was won by team Thailand. It started at 12:00 pm local time. Jazz Janewattananond and Pornanong Phatlum won 3 & 2 over Hideto Tanihara and Nasa Hataoka, Prayad Marksaeng and Ariya Jutanugarn won the last hole to halve Kodai Ichihara and Fumika Kawagishi, Ryuko Tokimatsu and Erika Hara won for the second time, this time 4 & 3 over Prom Meesawat/Pannarat Thanapolboonyaras. The fourt pairing, Sadom Kaewkanjana and Moriya Jutanugarn won over Yuto Katsuragawa and Sakura Koiwai one up.

Day two
Saturday, 22 December 2018

Morning foursomes

Afternoon four-ball

Day three
Sunday, 23 December 2018

Singles

Individual player records
Each entry refers to the win–loss–half record of the player.

Thailand

Japan

Partners

References

External links

Amata Friendship Cup
Golf tournaments in Thailand
Amata Friendship Cup
Amata Friendship Cup
Amata Friendship Cup
Amata Friendship Cup
Amata Friendship Cup